Jane Porter is an American author of contemporary romance and women's fiction. She is a New York Times and USA Today bestselling author of over forty-five titles, with over 12 million books in print, in 20 languages and in 25 countries. Her novel Flirting with Forty was made into the Lifetime movie of the same name starring Heather Locklear. In 2014, she received the Romance Writers of America RITA Award for Best Romance Novella for Take Me, Cowboy.

Biography

Porter was born in Visalia, California. She earned a Bachelor's degree from UCLA in American Studies, as well as Masters in Writing from the University of San Francisco.

She has worked in sales and marketing, as well as a director of a non-profit foundation and teacher of Jr. high and High school English. She sold her first novel, The Italian Groom, to Harlequin in 2000.

In 2005, Porter branched into women's fiction with the publication of The Frog Prince.

Porter founded Tule publishing in 2013.

She resides in San Clemente, California with her husband and three sons.

Bibliography

Bellevue Wives

A Brennan Sisters Novel

The Desert Kings

The Disgraced Copelands

The Galvan Brides

Princess Brides

A Royal Scandal

Taming of the Sheenans

Stand alone works 
 
 
 
 
 
 
 
 
 
 
 
 
 
 
 
 
  (in My Cowboy Valentine)

Anthologies and short stories 
  in One Christmas Night
  in Mistletoe Wishes

Non-fiction
  with Rebecca Lyles

Awards and reception
 2006 - Romance Reviews Today for Best Contemporary Novel for Flirting with Forty
 2013 - Golden Leaf Award for Best Novel with Romantic Elements for The Good Daughter
 2014 - Romance Writers of America RITA Award for Best Romance Novella for Take Me, Cowboy

Porter has garnered a starred review from Library Journal for Flirting with Forty, and several top picks from RT Book Reviews.

References

External links 
 Author's blog
 Author's website
 Jane Porter: 'Reading, I am free. Thanks, Grandma'
 STRANGER THAN FICTION FLIRTING WITH FORTY ROMANCE NOVELIST STARS IN HER OWN STORY IN WAIKIKI

Living people
21st-century American novelists
American romantic fiction writers
American women novelists
RITA Award winners
Year of birth missing (living people)
University of California, Los Angeles alumni
University of San Francisco alumni
21st-century American women writers